The Finnish People's Delegation was a governmental body, created by a group of members in the Social Democratic Party of Finland (SDP), to serve as the government of the Finnish Socialist Workers' Republic during the Finnish Civil War. The chair of the Delegation was the former Speaker of the Parliament Kullervo Manner.

The Delegation seized power at the start of the civil war by supplanting Pehr Evind Svinhufvud's first senate and the Parliament, after which it passed laws and enactments aspiring to a controlled social reformation as per the policy of the labor movement. A parliamentary Central Workers' Council also operated alongside the Delegation, although its role in the Reds' administration remained rather minor. The most ambitious of the Delegation's legislative undertakings was a proposition for a new constitution, which aimed at keeping a democratic foundation. The act could not be implemented amidst the war and the progress advanced in the complete opposite direction.

Soviet Russia was the only nation to recognize the Delegation as Finland's lawful government. At the final stages of the war at the beginning of April 1918, the Delegation moved from Helsinki to Vyborg from where its members eventually fled to Petrograd.

Formation and immediate actions
The decision to start an armed revolution was initially made by Red Guards' leadership and by a branch split from SDP's party committee on 23 January 1918 called "Finland's workers' executive committee", whose members represented the most radical wing of the labor movement. On the night of 27 January, the executive committee ordered the Red Guards to arrest members of the senate led by P. E. Svinhufvud, and a host of other leading capitalist politicians, including 33 members of Parliament; however, this failed completely. Red Guards' Supreme military staff postponed the coup by a day because of unfinished preparations, so the senators were informed of the arrest warrant through a prematurely issued public handout, and had time to hide. The assembling of Parliament on 28 January was blocked and a few members that turned up were arrested.

The People's Delegation was established on 28 January 1918 and it set to lead the revolt started on the same morning. The founding of the Delegation was announced on 29 January in the newspaper Työmies in a declaration that also named the delegates, and in which the fundamental objectives of the Red government were briefly explained. The Delegation already on its first day occupied the Senate House in Helsinki (current Government Palace).

The Red administration's first action was to discontinue all capitalist newspapers, already on 28 January in the capital, and over the next few days in other cities. On 2 February, the Delegation confirmed the "counterrevolutionary" press to be suspended "indefinitely". The suspension even applied to the right wing social democratic Työn Valta and Itä-Suomen Työmies newspapers. After this the only papers allowed to be published were the papers of the Social Democratic Party and the Christian labor movement. The Whites' Senate discontinued all social democratic papers correspondingly. In March the Delegation's Postal and Announcement Department placed preventive censorship on the remaining papers' reporting on the military and foreign affairs.

On 2 February, the Delegation ordered the Red Guards to be maintained by the government, and the Guards were essentially placed under its authority. In practice the Delegation was later forced to confess that it could barely control the actions of the Guards, and reduced the number of military affairs cases it handled. The relationship between the Red Guards and the Delegation remained problematic throughout the war, as the Delegation regarded the Guards' actions to be arbitrary, and many guardsmen in turn saw the delegates as "parasites" who were estranged from the realities of the battlefront.

The Delegation assembled for a session in Helsinki 89 times in all, and in Vyborg less than ten times. In its set of decrees it published 45 statutes in all, and favoured concised and scant language. Most of the Delegation's time went into producing new legislation. It has been estimated that about two thirds of its written laws were reactions to acute administerial issues, and the rest aimed at ideological goals or increasing support. Particularly the laws passed on ideological grounds were modeled after the legislation produced by the Paris Commune of 1871 and also the Russian Bolshevik Revolution, but mostly after Finland's labor movement's previous programmes. The laws passed by the Delegation were announced in the newspaper Suomen Kansanvaltuuskunnan Tiedonantoja.

Finnish People's Delegation members
The delegation members were elected and given similar roles as ministers in a government:
 chairman ("prime minister") Kullervo Manner
 delegate for foreign affairs ("foreign minister") Yrjö Sirola
 delegate for internal affairs ("internal minister") Eero Haapalainen, from March Adolf Taimi, Matti Airola and Hanna Karhinen
 delegate for justice ("minister of justice") Lauri Letonmäki and Antti Kiviranta
 delegate for education ("minister of education") Otto Wille Kuusinen
 delegate for monetary affairs ("minister  of finance") Jalo Kohonen, later Edvard Gylling
 delegate for labour ("minister of labour") Johan Erik Lumivuokko
 delegate for agriculture ("ministry of agriculture and forestry") Evert Eloranta
 delegate for provisions ("minister of supply") Oskari Tokoi
 delegate for transport ("minister of transport") Konstantin Lindqvist
 delegate for posts and information ("minister of communications") Emil Elo
 Procurator ("chancellor of justice") Matti Turkia.

Seats on the Supreme Workers' Council were allocated by the People's Delegation as follows:
 Finnish Trade Union Federation, 10
 Social Democratic Party of Finland, 10
 Red Guard, 10
 Helsinki Labour Unions, 5

Constitutional proposal
The People's Delegation drew up a new Constitution, taking influences from the American and Swiss Constitution and ideas from the French Revolution. A referendum on the proposal was planned.

End of People's Delegation
After the Civil War almost all of the members of the People's Delegation fled to Soviet Russia. Oskari Tokoi continued to Great Britain and from there to United States. The proposed Constitution was forgotten.

See also 

 Red Finland

References 

Finnish Civil War
Political history of Finland
Cabinets of Finland